"I Do" is a song written and performed by American singer-songwriter Lisa Loeb. Released on October 14, 1997, as the lead single from her second album, Firecracker (1997), "I Do" peaked at number 17 on the US Billboard Hot 100, becoming Loeb's second-highest charting single after her number-one debut single, "Stay (I Missed You)" (1994). In Canada, "I Do" gave Loeb her second number-one hit, after "Stay". This song was her last top-20 single in both countries.

Lyrics and composition
On the surface, the song seems to be about "the realization that a person isn't right for you, that the relationship has gone bad". However, the real intention of the song is different according to the liner notes for The Very Best of Lisa Loeb: "We were almost finished recording the album, Firecracker, and the record company told us that we still needed a single. I decided to write a song that sounded like a song about a relationship but was actually about the record company not 'hearing' a single on the record already. You can hear it in the lyrics, 'You can't hear it, but I do.' The song ended up being an expression of strength and power even when someone's not treating you right."

Reception
The song was warmly greeted by  Billboard magazine, which called the melody and chorus "nothing short of pure pop bliss."

Music video
In the music video, directed by Phil Harder in Minneapolis, it shows scenes of Lisa Loeb in black and white singing on an upside-down microphone and also lying down on the feather floor (like in the album's cover) then singing and playing guitar in a psychedelic room with several dancers around her. It also features paintings of her as well as the lyrics in some scenes (during Pop-up Video, the words would pop up in the same font as the words in the drawings, and the "I will" parts have the percentages).

Track listings

US CD and cassette single, UK cassette single
 "I Do"
 "Jake" (alternative version)

European CD single
 "I Do" (LP version)
 "Do You Sleep?" (live)

UK, Australian, and Japanese CD single
 "I Do" (LP version) – 3:41
 "Do You Sleep?" (live) – 3:35
 "Jake" (alternative version) – 3:00

Credits and personnel
Credits are lifted from the Firecracker album booklet.

Studios
 Recorded at various studios in New York City and Los Angeles with Pro Tools 4.0
 Mixed at Mix This! (Pacific Palisades, California)
 Mastered at Sterling Sound (New York City)

Personnel

 Lisa Loeb – writing, lead and harmony vocals, acoustic guitar, production
 Juan Patiño – harmony vocals and loops, production, engineering
 Tony Berg – electric guitars
 Leland Sklar – bass
 John "JR" Robinson – drums
 Bob Clearmountain – mixing
 David Bianco – basic track engineering
 Ryan Freeland – additional engineering (Mix This!)
 Ted Jensen – mastering

Charts

Weekly charts

Year-end charts

Release history

References

1997 singles
1997 songs
Geffen Records singles
Lisa Loeb songs
Music videos directed by Phil Harder
RPM Top Singles number-one singles
Songs written by Lisa Loeb